The Back Bay Formation is a geologic formation in New Brunswick. It preserves fossils dating back to the Silurian period.

See also

 List of fossiliferous stratigraphic units in New Brunswick

References
 

Silurian New Brunswick
Silurian southern paleotemperate deposits